The Yellow Ticket is a 1914 Broadway play by dramatist Michael Morton, which premiered at the Eltinge 42nd Street Theatre in Manhattan on January 20, 1914.

Plot
Anna Mirrel, a young Jewish girl in Czarist Russia, is forced to pretend to be a prostitute to obtain a prostitute's passport (a "yellow ticket") in order to visit her father, whom she believes to be ill. When she arrives in St. Petersburg, she learns that her father has been killed. She encounters a young journalist and tells him of the crimes the state perpetrates against its citizens.

Original cast
 John Barrymore as Julian Rolfe 
 Florence Reed as Marya Varenka 
 Emmett Corrigan as Monsieur Zoubatoff 
 A. C. P. Evans as Vassellevitch 
 Macy Harlam as Petrov Paviak 
 Elaine Inescort as Marjory Seaton 
 Julian L'Estrange as Count Nikolai Rostov 
 Harry Lillford as Boglosky 
 John B. Mason as Baron Stepan Audrey 
 David Torrence as John Seaton 
 Michael Wilens as Peter

In other media

Film
 The Yellow Passport, a 1916 silent film drama starring Clara Kimball Young as Sonia Sokoloff and Edwin August as Adolph Rosenheimer
 The Yellow Ticket, a 1918 silent film starring Fannie Ward as Anna Mirrel, and Milton Sills as Julian Rolfe
 The Yellow Ticket, a 1931 pre-Code American drama film starring Elissa Landi as Marya Kalish and Laurence Olivier as Julian Rolfe.

See also
 Der Gelbe Schein (English titles: The Yellow Ticket and The Devil's Pawn).

References

External links
 "The Yellow Ticket" at Internet Broadway Database (IBDB)

1914 plays
Plays by Michael Morton
British plays adapted into films